Maretto is a comune (municipality) in the Province of Asti in the Italian region Piedmont, located about  southeast of Turin and about  northwest of Asti.

Maretto borders the following municipalities: Cortandone, Cortazzone, Monale, Roatto, and Villafranca d'Asti.

References

Cities and towns in Piedmont